In medicine, animal allergy is hypersensitivity to certain substances produced by animals, such as the proteins in animal hair and saliva. It is a common type of allergy.

Signs and symptoms
Symptoms of an allergic reaction to animals may include itchy skin, nasal congestion, itchy nose, sneezing, chronic sore throat or itchy throat, swollen, red, itchy, and watery eyes, coughing, asthma, or rash on the face or chest.

Causes
Allergies are caused by an oversensitive immune system, leading to a misdirected immune response. The immune system normally protects the body against harmful substances such as bacteria and viruses. Allergy occurs when the immune system reacts to substances (allergens) that are generally harmless and in most people do not cause an immune response.

Animal hair and dander
cockroach calyx
dust mite excretion

See also
Cat allergy
List of allergens

References

Immune system disorders
Allergology